The Neo Sky Dome is a residential skyscraper complex located in Banqiao District, New Taipei, Taiwan. The shortest in the complex is Tower A, which rises  with 40 floors above ground. 

As of 2020, Neo Sky Dome Tower B is the twelfth tallest building in Taiwan and the second tallest in New Taipei City (after Far Eastern Mega Tower).

See also 
 List of tallest buildings in Taiwan
 List of tallest buildings in New Taipei City

References

2010 establishments in Taiwan
Residential skyscrapers in Taiwan
Skyscrapers in New Taipei
Apartment buildings in Taiwan
Residential buildings completed in 2010